The 1944 Great Lakes Navy Bluejackets football team represented Great Lakes Naval Training Station during the 1944 college football season. The team compiled a 9–2–1 record, outscored opponents by a total of 348 to 134, and was ranked No. 17 in the final AP Poll.

In April 1944, Paul Brown, who coached at Ohio State before the war, was commissioned as a lieutenant and assigned to coach the Great Lakes football team.

The players on the 1944 Great Lakes team included backs Jim Youel (quarterback, Iowa), Eddie Saenz (left halfback, USC), Chuck Avery (right halfback, Minnesota), Jim Mello (fullback, Notre Dame), Don Lesher (halfback), Don Manglold (Indiana), Bob Hanlon, and Ara Parseghian (Miami (OH)), ends Cecil Souders and George Young (Georgia), and linemen Pete Krivonak (guard), Jesse Hahn (guard), and Carmen Izzo (center).

Schedule

Rankings

References

Great Lakes Navy
Great Lakes Navy Bluejackets football seasons
Great Lakes Navy Bluejackets football